Robert Rovner is an American television producer and writer, best known for his work on TV shows Crossing Jordan, Private Practice, Dallas (2012 TV series), Bionic Woman, Summerland, American Dreams (NBC)  and Supergirl (TV series).

Career
He served as showrunner/executive producer and writer of Grey's Anatomy's 2007 spin-off series, Private Practice as well as the final season of Crossing Jordan.  He was also an executive producer and writer on "Dallas" (TNT). He is currently Co-Showrunner/Executive Producer on Supergirl alongside Jessica Queller.

Private Practice
Rovner joined the Private Practice writing staff in its second season. He is credited as the writer or co-writer of the following Private Practice episodes:

 "Tempting Faith" (2008)
 "Nothing to Fear" (2009)
 "Ex-Life" (2009)
 "Yours, Mine & Ours" (2009)
 "A Death in the Family" (2009)
 "Shotgun" (2010)

Personal life
He is married to the current chairman of NBC Entertainment Susan Rosner Rovner.

References

External links
 

Year of birth missing (living people)
Living people
American male screenwriters
American television producers
Showrunners